The Odunde Festival is a one-day festival and mostly a street market catered to African-American interests and the African diaspora. It is derived from the tradition of the Yoruba people of Nigeria in celebration of the new year.  It is centered at the intersection of Grays Ferry Avenue and South Street in the U.S. city of Philadelphia, Pennsylvania.

Ruth Arthur and Lois Fernandez were co-founders of Odunde festival. Ruth died at age 64 in 1997. Lois died at age 81 in 2017.

History
The Odunde festival started in Philadelphia in 1975. Lois Fernandez and her friend Ruth Arthur organized the first Odunde Festival. It took place in April 1975, 
as the "Oshun Festival". The goal was to bring together the community and to foster awareness of and pride in black history and culture. The festival began with $100 from neighborhood donations.  

The festival is now the largest African celebration on the east coast of the United States. It is held in the month of June. The festival brings in Africans from all parts of the world, including Africa, Brazil, and other places around the United States.  
According to WXPN, "... beginning with an all-inclusive spiritual procession to the Schuylkill River, the festival carries on from 10 a.m. to 8 p.m., filling the day with vibrant traditional clothing, African food, and art and craft vendors from around the world."

There was no festival in 2020.

See also
 African-American neighborhood

References

External links
 ODUNDE365 Official festival website

African-American festivals
Africans in the United States
Brazilian-American culture
Festivals in Philadelphia
Southwest Center City, Philadelphia
Yoruba-American history
Yoruba culture
African festivals